Barbara Beckett (born c. 1955) is a Northern Irish badminton player.

Biography
Barbara Beckett won her first titles in 1973 at both the Irish Championships and the Irish Open. In the same year she also won at Welsh International. In 1980 she was first at the Scottish Open. In total, she won 20 national titles. She was coached by Cyril W. Wilkinson.

Achievements

References

1950s births
Irish female badminton players
20th-century people from Northern Ireland
21st-century people from Northern Ireland
Living people